NBA In The Zone '99, known in Europe as NBA Pro 99, is a basketball game for the Nintendo 64 and PlayStation, released in 1999. It is the fourth installment of the NBA In The Zone series. The game has two covers of NBA All-Star Glen Rice, (one of him with the Charlotte Hornets, and the other of him with the Los Angeles Lakers).

Gameplay
NBA In The Zone '99 features updated rosters from the 1998–99 NBA Lockout Season.

Reception

The game received average reviews on both platforms according to the review aggregation website GameRankings. Next Generation said of the PlayStation version, "Once considered the pinnacle of NBA hoops games, In the Zone 99 [sic] appears to be a mere shadow of its one-time glory."

Notes

References

External links

1999 video games
Konami games
NBA In The Zone
Nintendo 64 games
PlayStation (console) games
Video games developed in Japan